Nacha Pop was a Spanish pop/rock group active from 1978 to 1988.

The band was formed by Antonio Vega and Nacho García Vega (guitars and vocals), Carlos Brooking (bass) and Ñete (drums). They signed with Spanish EMI subsidiary Hispavox in 1980, and their debut album was produced by Teddy Bautista. Several albums followed, including 1987's El Momento, which was produced by Carlos Narea. Their final concerts took place on October 19 and 20, 1988, after which the group disbanded.

In 1987, Nacha Pop released what would be their most successful album at the time, El Momento. It contained several hit singles, that became a huge success in Spain, Argentina and Mexico. Emphasizing the New Wave track, Persiguiendo Sombras and the memorable hit Lucha De Gigantes climbed to the top of the charts in Spain and Mexico during 1987 and 1988. In addition, the band gave a massive concert at Plaza México - which became their first live performance ever in Latin America.

In 2000, Alejandro González Iñárritu used the Nacha Pop song "Lucha de Gigantes" in the film Amores Perros.

Nacha Pop reunited in 2007.  Antonio Vega died in Madrid on May 12, 2009 of lung cancer at age 51.

Discography
 Nacha Pop (EMI-Hispavox, 1980)
 Buena disposición (EMI-Hispavox, 1982)
 Más números, otras Letras (DRO, 1983)
 Una décima de segundo (DRO, 1984), Maxi-single
 Dibujos animados (Polydor, 1985)
 El momento (Polydor, 1987)
 80-88 (Polydor, 1988)
 Efecto Inmediato (Cera Real Discos, 2017)

Compilations 
 Bravo (1996).
 Lo mejor de Nacha Pop - Rico - Antonio Vega (1997)
 Un día cualquiera: colección de canciones (2003)
 La Más Completa Colección Nacha Pop (2005)

References

Spanish pop rock music groups
Musical groups from Madrid
1978 establishments in Spain
Musical groups established in 1978